Presidential elections were held in the Soviet Union on 14 March 1990 to elect a president for a five-year term. This was the only presidential election in the Soviet Union, as the post of president was introduced in 1990, and the Soviet Union dissolved in the following year. The elections were uncontested, with Mikhail Gorbachev, then-General Secretary of the Communist Party of the Soviet Union as the only candidate.

Although the constitution required the president to be directly-elected, it was decided that the first elections should be held on an indirect basis as it was necessary for a president to be elected immediately and processes taking place in the country did not leave time for elections to be held.

Background
On 7 February 1990, about a month prior to the election, Communist Party leaders voted on establishing a presidency. The third (extraordinary) Congress of People's Deputies of the USSR began on 12 March 1990. The congress decided to create the post of President of the USSR. The president would be elected to five-year terms. The CPD would elect the president for this election cycle, then turn over future elections to the public starting in 1995—which never happened due to the USSR's collapse in 1991.

Candidates
On 14 March, during a plenum of the CPSU Central Committee, Gorbachev, Interior Minister Vadim Bakatin and former Prime Minister Nikolai Ryzhkov were nominated as presidential candidates; however, Bakatin and Ryzhkov withdrew their candidacies.

Nominee

Withdrew

Mikhail Gorbachev's campaign
Gorbachev worked with the Congress to make sure that he secured a two-thirds majority; otherwise, he would have to campaign against other candidates in a general election. One of the tactics he used was repeatedly threatening to resign if a two-thirds majority wasn't attained.

Results
At the time of the elections, 2,245 of the 2,250 seats were filled; however, 245 did not attend the Congress and a further 122 did not vote.

Aftermath
On 15 March, the day after the election, at a meeting of the Congress of People's Deputies, Gorbachev took office as President. On 24 March, 10 days after the election, President Gorbachev appointed his cabinet.

Reactions 
The means of this election drew mixed reactions. Sergei Stankevich, a deputy from Moscow, decided that he would abstain from voting, despite supporting Gorbachev, because he believed that the president should face a nationwide vote. Others were upset with the lack of opposition against Gorbachev for a position that sought to increase democracy throughout the USSR. Sakhalin Island deputy Ivan Zhdakayev expressed discontent over this: "Elections mean a popular vote, not this charade." Kazakhstani deputy Olzhas Suleimenov believed that reforms under Gorbachev were inconsistent.

References

President
One-party elections
Single-candidate elections